Citrus undulata, synonym Oxanthera undulata, the wavy-leaf oxanthera, is a species of plant in the family Rutaceae. It is endemic to New Caledonia.

Taxonomy
Originally characterized and named as Citrus undulata by André Guillaumin in 1938, this species along with the other false oranges were moved to a novel genus, Oxanthera, in the Swingle and Tanaka systems of citrus taxonomy. Phylogenetic analysis showed that Oxanthera species clustered within Citrus, which makes this species a member of that genus.

References

 

Endemic flora of New Caledonia
undulata
Critically endangered plants
Taxonomy articles created by Polbot
Taxobox binomials not recognized by IUCN